The Nordic Championships (Nordiska Mästerskapen) are an annual elite figure skating competition. It was originally open only to representatives of Denmark, Finland, Iceland, Norway, and Sweden. However, representatives of any ISU member nation may enter the senior-level event since 2011 and in the junior-level event since 2020. The novice-level competition remains restricted to the Nordic countries. Medals may be awarded on the senior, junior, and novice levels in men's singles, ladies' singles, pair skating, and ice dancing, although the latter two disciplines are often omitted due to lack of entries. Prominent Nordic champions include Olympic champions Gillis Grafström, Magda Julin, and Ludowika Jakobsson-Eilers / Walter Jakobsson.

Senior medalists

Men

Ladies

Pairs

Ice dance

Junior medalists

Men

Ladies

Pairs

Ice dance

Advanced novice medalists

Boys

Girls

See also
 European Figure Skating Championships

References

 
Nordics
Inter-Nordic sports competitions